George Heard Hamilton (1910 – March 29, 2004) was an American art historian, educator, and curator. Hamilton taught art history at Yale University and Williams College, as well as acting as Director of the Yale University Art Gallery and the Clark Art Institute.

Career
Born in Pittsburgh to Frank and Georgia Heard, Hamilton received three degrees from Yale University: a Bachelor of Arts in English in 1932, a Master of Arts in History in 1934, and a Doctor of Philosophy in Art History in 1942. He wrote a doctoral dissertation on the artist Eugène Delacroix. In 1937, Hamilton attended the Coronation of George VI and Elizabeth with lifelong friend Elizabeth Wade White.

Hamilton began his curatorial career as a research assistant at the Walters Art Museum from 1934 to 1936, but then, returned to Yale to join the art history faculty. In 1940, he was also named Curator of Modern Art at the Yale University Art Gallery, as well as a stint as Associate Director from 1946 to 1948. Hamilton was named full professor in 1956 and remained there until 1966. That year, Hamilton joined Williams College as Professor of Art History (until 1975) and Director of their Clark Art Institute (until 1977). He was a scholar of modern art and Russian art, focusing on such artists as Marcel Duchamp and Édouard Manet.

Hamilton died in Williamstown in 2004. Papers from Hamilton's tenure at Yale are held by the Yale University Library.

Awards
Guggenheim Fellowship (1958)
Slade Professor of Fine Art, Cambridge University (1971)
Wilbur Cross Medal (1976)

See also
List of people from Pittsburgh
List of Williams College people
List of Yale University people

References

External links
Dictionary of Art Historians profile
Oxford Reference profile

1910 births
2004 deaths
Writers from Pittsburgh
Historians from Pennsylvania
American art historians
American art curators
Yale University alumni
Yale University faculty
Williams College faculty
Slade Professors of Fine Art (University of Cambridge)
Directors of museums in the United States